Blue Cow may refer to:

 Blue Cow (cartoon), a cartoon cow who appears in both The Story Makers and Tikkabilla
 Blue Cow, New South Wales, a village in NSW, Australia
 The Blue Cow, one of the "blue" public houses and inns in Grantham
 Belgian Blue, a breed of cattle 
 Nilgai, an Indian Antelope whose name translates to "Blue Cow"